Emperatriz Wilson Traba (born January 25, 1966) is a retired female long-distance runner from Cuba.

Career
She represented her native country at the 1991 Pan American Games in Havana, Cuba, where she claimed the bronze medal in the women's marathon event behind Mexico's Olga Appell (gold) and compatriot Maribel Durruty (silver). Wilson set her personal best (2:36:35) in the marathon on December 13, 1992 in Caracas. In Cuba she is praised as one of the best female runners, winning several times the Marabana half marathon and marathon.

Achievements

References

External links
 Profile
 

1966 births
Living people
Cuban female long-distance runners
Cuban female marathon runners
Athletes (track and field) at the 1991 Pan American Games
Athletes (track and field) at the 2003 Pan American Games
Pan American Games bronze medalists for Cuba
Pan American Games medalists in athletics (track and field)
Central American and Caribbean Games bronze medalists for Cuba
Competitors at the 1993 Central American and Caribbean Games
Cuban female cross country runners
Central American and Caribbean Games medalists in athletics
Medalists at the 1991 Pan American Games